Sora or SORA may refer to:

People
 Sora (Japanese given name), a unisex Japanese given name
 Sora (Korean given name), a feminine Korean given name
 Lembu Sora, Indonesian warlord
 Ciprian Sora, Romanian former kickboxer
 Mihai Șora, Romanian philosopher 
 Sora people, an Indian ethnic group

Places

 Sora, Chile
 Sora, Boyacá, Central Boyacá Province, Colombia
 Sora (Klipphausen), Meißen, Saxony, Germany
 Sora (Wilthen), Bautzen, Saxony, Germany
 Sora, Lazio, Italy
 Sorá, Chame District, Panama
 Sora, Medvode, Slovenia
 Sora (river), in Upper Carniola, Slovenia
 Sora-myeon, Yeosu, South Jeolla, South Korea
 Sora, Barcelona, Catalonia, Spain
 Sora (Anatolia), Turkey

Entertainment
 Sora (album), a 2007 album by Japanese singer Yui Aragaki
 "Sora" song on Sora (album)
 "Sora" (song), by Soulhead, 2003
 Sora (Kingdom Hearts), the protagonist in the Kingdom Hearts series
 Sora Ltd., a Japanese video game developer
 Project Sora, a subsidiary of Japanese video game developer Nintendo
 Soap opera rapid aging syndrome, a plot device in television dramas

SORA
 Sapporo Convention Center, also known as SORA
 Southern Rails Cooperative, with reporting mark "SORA"

Other uses
 Cycling apparel brand in Turkey Sora Cycling
 Sora (bird), a small waterbird of the family Rallidae
 Sora language, spoken in India
 ACS-100 Sora, a Brazilian light sports aircraft
 A.S.D. G.C. Sora, an Italian association football club
 Shimano Sora, an entry level road bicycle component groupset by Shimano
 Selective orexin receptor antagonist, a type of sleep medication

See also
 Sola (disambiguation)